Natalie Alt (born Natalie Altman, September 30, 1890 – August 10, 1959) was a Broadway actress and singer.

Productions
The Grass Widow (1917)
Come to Bohemia (1916)
The Girl Who Smiles (1915) 
The Sorcerer (1915 revival)
The Mikado (1915 revival)
The Yeomen of the Guard (1915 revival)
Adele (1913) 
The Fascinating Widow
London Follies, the production nearly started a riot in the audience, her singing when she came on stage stilled the theater.
The Balky Princess
The Lamb of Delft
Jumping Jupiter (1911)
 When Sweet Sixteen (1910)
Little Nemo (1909, as Natalie Alte)

References

Further reading
 Display Ad (September 24, 1912). "An Expert Opinion: Miss Natalie Alt, the Charming Prima Donna of 'The Quaker Girl,' Expresses Her Opinion of Hardman Pianos". The Richmond Times-Dispatch. Page 7.
 Display Ad (October 8, 1912). "It Reaches the Soul of 'The Quaker Girl'". The Atlanta Constitution. Page 7.
 Kingsley, Grace (November 12, 1912). "No Chance for Johnnies: Natalie Alt's Mommer Sticks Close Around; And 'Quaker Girl' Takes Nap Each Afternoon; She's Wise Though and She Knows It". The Los Angeles Times. Page 34.
 Staff photographer (March 12, 1917). "Pretty Natalie Alt". San Francisco Examiner. Page 10.
 Staff (June 21, 1931). "Natalie Alt to Be Featured in New Music Show". Chicago Sunday Tribune. Page 16.

External links

Natalie Alt from the Library of Congress at Flickr Commons
Natalie Alt (New York City Public Library, Billy Rose collection)

1890 births
1959 deaths
20th-century American actresses
20th-century American singers
American musical theatre actresses
Actresses from New York City
Singers from New York City